The Kow Swamp, a freshwater lake and wetland, was formerly a swamp, that is now used for water storage. The lake is located in the Mallee region in north-central Victoria, Australia.

Description
Its name comes from the Aboriginal word Ghow which refers to the white gypsum soil found at the swamp. It is a popular site for recreational fishing.

History
In the late 19th century Kow Swamp was managed by local irrigation trusts for off-river storage.

Archaeology

Kow Swamp is an archaeological site which has produced human skeletal remains dating from the late Pleistocene, over 10,000 years ago.

References

Lakes of Victoria (Australia)
North-Central catchment
Rivers of Loddon Mallee (region)
Mallee (Victoria)